Paruraecha is a genus of longhorn beetles of the subfamily Lamiinae, containing the following species:

subgenus Arisania
 Paruraecha acutipennis (Gressitt, 1942)
 Paruraecha submarmorata (Gressitt, 1936)

subgenus Paruraecha
 Paruraecha sikkimensis Breuning, 1938
 Paruraecha szetschuanica Breuning, 1935

References

Lamiini